Mosha is a work of science fiction written in Bengali by the novelist Premendra Mitra. This story was first published by Deb Sahitya Kutir, Kolkata, West Bengal, India, in the Puja Annual titled Alpana in 1945. Ghanashyam Das alias GhanaDa, the fictional character and the protagonist of the GhanaDa series of science-fiction stories appeared first time in this novel.

Characterization
The character of Ghanashyam Das alias GhanaDa was outlined as a bachelor, dark complexioned male with tall, boney and skeletal structure, having age “anywhere between thirty five to fifty five”, as described by the author himself in Mosha, the first story of the GhanaDa series. He stayed in the third floor attic of a shared apartment at no. 72, Banamali Naskar Lane, Calcutta, West Bengal, India, along with other boarders, who called him Ghana-da, while the term “da” is a suffix added to the name of an elder male in Bengal to convey reverence and affection. Though he was rarely found engaged in any activity or work other than telling fantastic tales to the boarders of the apartment, his stories engaged him with most of the major events happened in the world for last two hundred years and there was probably no place on earth which he didn't visit. 

Premendra Mitra, the creator, described Ghana~da in an interview by A K Ganguly published in SPAN in 1974, as under:

Plot

It was an evening in Calcutta in the year 1945. The boarders of the shared apartment at no. 72, Banamali Naskar Lane gathered in the common room and were busy chatting casually amongst themselves on various topics. Bipin, one of the boarders, mentioned about arrangements of eradication of mosquitos in his village. Just at that moment GhanaDa appeared. With due respect he was offered the lone easy chair which was the best seat around, and a cigarette from Shishir as loan. GhanaDa humbly declared that he killed just one mosquito in his life time once on 5th August, 1939 in Sakhalin island of Japan. 

The story narrated by GhanaDa revealed that he was engaged by a company in Sakhalin to collect amber sometime during 1939. Whern Tanlin, a chinese laborer went missing with a bag of amber, GhanaDa along with Mr. Martin, the doctor, initiateda search for him. Tipped by a Gilyak tribesman he landed up to a scientific laboratory set by Mr. Nishimara, an entomologist. It was later revealed that Mr. Nishamara was genetically converting the mosquitos into deadly agents of biological warfare, and Tanlin became a victim of his cruel experiment. When the lone genetically engineered mosquito landed of the face of Mr. Nishimara and sealed his fate by stinging him, GhanaDa slapped Nishmara killing the mosquito and eliminated once and for all a severe threat towards humanity. He declared he never intended to kill another mosquito ever after in his life time.

Characters
Ghanashyam Das alias Ghanada
Bipin (appeared in this story only)
Shishir
Author (anonymous in this story. However, now we know it was Sudhir)
Tanlin (a Chinese laborer)
Mr. Martin (doctor)
Mr. Nishimara (a Japanese entomologist)
An African attendant of Mr. Nishimara

Important dates
5th August, 1939: GhanaDa killed one genetically engineered mosquito at Sakhalin island.
1st September, 1939: World War II began.
11th August, 1945: Russia invaded Sakhalin South.
15th August, 1945: Japan surrendered, ending World War II.

Historical relevance
World War II is generally considered to have begun on 1 September 1939, with the invasion of Poland by Germany and subsequent declarations of war on Germany by France and the United Kingdom. GhanaDa's appearance on Sakhalin island on 5th August, 1939 was immediately before the initiation of the WWII. At that time Sakhalin island was divided into two parts. Northern part was occupied by Russia and the south by Japan. it is pertinent to be noted that on 11th August, 1945 Russia invaded Japanese part of Sakhalin and it was on 15th August 1945 Japan surrendered, ending the World War II. It was 28 Aashwin of 1352 of Bengali era, Maha Navami during Durga Puja festival celebrated in India and Bengal. So, when Alpana, the Puja Annual of Deb Sahitya Kutir was released in 1945, affairs at Sakhalin were in the recent news and this story was a sensational hit amongst the readers. Even GhanaDa anticipated this:

Scientific relevance

Biological engineering
Development of biological warfare has been widely carried out by many countries. During the World War II and even afterwards, many countries including USA, Germany and Japan were engaged in developing biological warfare. The author, Premendra Mitra, was aware of the latest developments in Japan and elsewhere, and aptly used this phenomenon in this pioneering novel of GhanaDa series. 
Anthropology
Since 7000 BCE the predominant tundra belt between the Arctic Ocean and Anadyr River and the taiga zone between the Anadyr and Koryak Mountains were characterized by nomadic hunters mainly pursuing wild reindeer, supplemented by some inland fishing and plant gathering, whose traces was found in the Nivkhi  tribes residing in Sakhalin and eastern parts of Asia, who were called “Gilyak” till 1930s. It was found that in 2002, only 4902 nos. of nearly extinct Gilyaks existed on the earth. One such Gyliak hunter gave GhanaDa some important lead towards solving the problem.

References

External links

1945 short stories
Indian short stories
Science fiction short stories
Short stories set in India
Ghanada short stories